Lester S. Hill (1891–1961) was an American mathematician and educator who was interested in applications of mathematics to communications.  He received a bachelor's degree from Columbia College (1911) and a Ph.D. from Yale University (1926).  He taught at the University of Montana, Princeton University, the University of Maine, Yale University, and Hunter College.  Among his notable contributions was the Hill cipher.  He also developed methods for detecting errors in telegraphed code numbers and wrote two books.

References 

 Rosen, Kenneth (2005). Elementary Number Theory and its Applications, fifth edition, Addison-Wesley, p. 292.

1891 births
Columbia College (New York) alumni
Yale University alumni
University of Montana faculty
Princeton University faculty
University of Maine faculty
Yale University faculty
Hunter College faculty
1961 deaths
20th-century American mathematicians
Mathematicians from New York (state)